The 5th constituency of the Seine-Maritime (French: Cinquième circonscription de la Seine-Maritime) is a French legislative constituency in the Seine-Maritime département. Like the other 576 French constituencies, it elects one MP using the two-round system, with a run-off if no candidate receives over 50% of the vote in the first round.

Description

The 5th Constituency of the Seine-Maritime covers a large central area in the southern part of the department to the west of Rouen.
The seat adjoins the city as it includes the suburb of Notre-Dame-de-Bondeville, it does however also include a large swathe of the Boucles of the Seine Regional Natural Park.

Politically the seat has remained a solid bastion for the Socialist Party. In 2017 the seat was a rare example of them retaining a seat.

Christophe Bouillon was elected mayor of Barentin on 28 May 2020 and resigned on 18 June for multiple mandates. His substitute, Bastien Coriton, also elected mayor in Rives-en-Seine, resigned five days after taking office. A by-election was held on 20 and 27 September 2020.

Deputies

Election results

2022

2020 by-election

 
 
 
 
 
 
 
|-
| colspan="8" bgcolor="#E9E9E9"|
|-

2017

 
 
 
 
 
|-
| colspan="8" bgcolor="#E9E9E9"|
|-

2012

 
 
 
 
 
 
|-
| colspan="8" bgcolor="#E9E9E9"|
|-

2007

 
 
 
 
 
 
 
|-
| colspan="8" bgcolor="#E9E9E9"|
|-

2002

 
 
 
 
 
 
 
 
|-
| colspan="8" bgcolor="#E9E9E9"|
|-

1997

 
 
 
 
 
 
 
 
|-
| colspan="8" bgcolor="#E9E9E9"|
|-

References

5